Dynoides artocanalis is a species of isopod in the family Sphaeromatidae.

References

artocanalis